Esther Gentle (1899 – 1991) was a New York City sculptor, painter, printmaker, and gallery manager.  Gentle ran an art reproductions business, Esther Gentle Reproductions, and a New York City art gallery. Her work is part of the Leepa-Rattner Museum of Art's permanent collection.

Gentle was the first American woman sculptor given a one-person show at the Musée d’Art Moderne in Paris.

Esther Gentle and Abraham Rattner's papers were donated to the Archives of American Art, Smithsonian Institution.

Personal life 
She married Abraham Rattner in 1949. She was the mother of Dr. Allen Leepa. In 1921, prior to her Rattner marriage, she gave birth to twins Herbert (1921-2008) and Bernard Zipkin (1921-2016), by Harry Zipkin, a Brooklyn painter.

Exhibitions 

 1963 Salon des Indépendants
1988 Ageless Perceptions, SOHO20

References

1899 births
1991 deaths
American women sculptors
Painters from New York City
American printmakers
American women painters
American women printmakers
20th-century American women artists
Sculptors from New York (state)